The Atkinson and Northern Railroad was founded in the late 19th century or early 20th century to operate north from Atkinson, Nebraska, to a point in Boyd County, Nebraska.  Although several cuts were made in preparation for the railroad, no track was laid and the railroad folded before it began.

Sources
 Holt County Historical Society

Defunct Nebraska railroads